Lehel (died 955) was a Magyar leader.

Lehel may also refer to:

 A district of Munich, Germany, part of the borough of Altstadt-Lehel
 Lehel (appliances), a Hungarian appliance company
 Lehel tér (Budapest Metro), a Budapest Metro station
 Lehel (Munich U-Bahn), a Munich U-Bahn station
 Peter Lehel (born 1965), German jazz saxophonist and composer
  (1926–1989), Hungarian musician